Albert Vollrat (21 October 1903 Tallinn – 10 April 1978 Tallinn) was an Estonian wrestler and football coach.

In 1921 he achieved 4th place at World Wrestling Championships in Helsinki (weight category until 58 kg).

1922-1927 he won several medals at Estonian Wrestling Championships.

1932 he was team manager of Estonian national football team.

References

1903 births
1978 deaths
Estonian male sport wrestlers
Estonian football managers
Estonia national football team managers
Sportspeople from Tallinn
20th-century Estonian people